Cong Yuzhen (born January 22, 1963) is a former shot put athlete from China. She competed at the 1988 Summer Olympics in Seoul, South Korea, finishing in ninth place in the overall-rankings.

Achievements

References

1963 births
Living people
Athletes (track and field) at the 1988 Summer Olympics
Chinese female shot putters
Olympic athletes of China
Asian Games medalists in athletics (track and field)
Athletes (track and field) at the 1986 Asian Games
Asian Games silver medalists for China
Medalists at the 1986 Asian Games
20th-century Chinese women